Christine Douglas is an Australian opera singer and director.

Douglas, a soprano, trained at the Victorian College of the Arts. She performed in multiple Australian Opera productions including Cosi fan tutte, Fidelio, La Bohème, A Midsummer Night's Dream, Pagliacci,  The Magic Flute, Patience, and Hansel and Gretel.

The soundtrack album to an Opera Australia staging of Hansel and Gretel earned a nomination for the 1999 ARIA Award for Cast or Show Album for Opera Australia, Christine Douglas and Suzanne Johnston.

In 2003 Douglas and Sylvie Renaud-Calmel established Pacific Opera. With Douglas as artistic director they have staged productions of several operas including Cosi fan Tutti set in a football club, Barber of Seville done "Los Angeles style" and The Magic Flute as a circus show. She has also directed The Marriage of Figaro for Opera Australia.

Awards and nominations

ARIA Music Awards
The ARIA Music Awards is an annual awards ceremony that recognises excellence, innovation, and achievement across all genres of Australian music. They commenced in 1987. 

! 
|-
| 1999
| Hansel & Gretel (with Opera Australia & Suzanne Johnston)
| Best Original Cast or Show Album
| 
| 
|-

References

External links
Christine Douglas

Australian musicians
Living people
Year of birth missing (living people)